Peter Michael may refer to:

 Peter Michael (artist) (born 1972), English painter
 Peter K. Michael, Attorney General of Wyoming
 Sir Peter Michael (engineer) (born 1938), British engineer and businessman
 Peter Michael (speed skater) (born 1989), New Zealand athlete
 Peter Godly Michael (born 1998), Nigerian footballer

See also
 Michael Peter (1949–1997), field hockey player from West Germany
 Peter Michel (born 1938), German art scholar, publicist and exhibition organizer